Evergestis dischematalis is a moth in the family Crambidae. It is found in North America, where it has been recorded from Arizona and New Mexico.

References

Moths described in 1995
Evergestis
Moths of North America